Sevastyanovo is a settlement on Karelian Isthmus, in Priozersky District of Leningrad Oblast. Until the Winter War and Continuation War, it had been the administrative center of the Kaukola municipality of the Viipuri Province of Finland.

Rural localities in Leningrad Oblast
Karelian Isthmus